Santucho is a surname. Notable people with the surname include:

 Carlos Santucho (born 1985), Uruguayan soccer player
 Diego Thomas de Santuchos (1549–1624), Spanish conquistador
 Mario Roberto Santucho (1936–1976), Argentine guerrilla